Out of the Box is an American children's television series which premiered on Playhouse Disney on October 7, 1998, and ended its run on September 27, 2004, with reruns until June 2006 (December 2006 in the UK). The series takes place in "The Box", a playhouse made entirely of cardboard boxes, where two hosts, Tony James and Vivian Bayubay McLaughlin, make crafts, sing songs, and act out plays.

Two special episodes were released on VHS by Walt Disney Home Video, Out of the Box: Trick or Treat, and Out of the Box: Happy Holidays.  Trick or Treat is also available on the DVD entitled Rolie Polie Olie: A Spookie Ookie Halloween.

The series was created and executive produced by Douglas Love and was based on his series of books from HarperCollins. Three seasons were filmed at Lifetime Studios in New York City.  The series earned three Parents' Choice Awards for excellence in television and an Emmy nomination.

Prior to its release on Disney+, on November 12, 2019, most of the show's episodes were considered lost media due to a lack of home releases.

Overview
Every day, Tony and Vivian take care of a small group of neighborhood children. They come and play in "The Box", a clubhouse made entirely out of cardboard boxes. They do crafts, sing songs, and act out stories revolved around the episode's theme. At the end of the day, either Tony or Vivian walking the kids home while the other recaps the day's events. Every episode ends with Tony and Vivian singing their Goodbye Song. The song is either sung a cappella by Vivian and with Tony tapping on a pumpkin or some other object, but in three episodes Tony plays it on his guitar. In two episodes, the kids join in to the Goodbye Song; after they finished, they wave to the viewers and the camera would move out as a piano ending of the Goodbye Song plays. In one episode, Vivian told the viewers that she will tell Tony they are thinking of him.

Cast
 Tony James as himself
 Vivian Bayubay McLaughlin as herself
 Brandon Zemel as Brandon (season 1)  
 Sue Rose as Cece (season 1) 
 Jill Schackner as Jill (season 1) 
 Matthew Storff as Matt (season 1)
 Dane Hammond as Dane (seasons 1–2)
 Aleisha Allen as Aleisha (seasons 1-3)
 Nicholas Eng as Nicholas (seasons 1-3) 
 Celine Margaret Ordioni as Celine (season 2) 
 Spiridoula Cardona as Spiri (season 2) 
 Michael Mylett as Michael (season 2) 
 Tyler Lee as Tyler (season 2)
 Christopher Jordan as Christopher (season 2) 
 Lindsey Pickering as Lindsey (season 2)
 Elijah Rivera as Elijah (season 3) 
 Andrea Rosario as Andrea (season 3) 
 Madeleine Martin as Madeleine (season 3) 
 Bradley Duck as Brad (season 3) 
 Zachary Ross as Zachary (season 3)   
 Andrew Feinberg as Andrew (season 3)

Episodes
The series comprises 82 episodes in total.

Unless otherwise stated, the source of production codes and airdates is the United States Copyright Office.

Season 1 (1998)

Season 2 (1999–2000)

Season 3 (2002–2004)

Notes

References

External links

Disney Channel original programming
1990s American children's television series
2000s American children's television series
1990s American music television series
2000s American music television series
1998 American television series debuts
2004 American television series endings
American preschool education television series
American children's musical television series
Television series by Disney
Disney Junior original programming
Television series about children
1990s preschool education television series
2000s preschool education television series